The Northern Virginia Daily is a daily newspaper based in Strasburg, Virginia, serving the Northern Shenandoah Valley, including Shenandoah County, Frederick County, Clarke County, Warren County and the City of Winchester.

The newspaper has a weekday circulation average of 10,333, according to the Audit Bureau of Circulations, with a Saturday circulation of 11,126. It is owned by Ogden Newspapers.

References

External links
 
 

Daily newspapers published in Virginia
Shenandoah County, Virginia
Publications established in 1932
1932 establishments in Virginia